The Frizzoni Madonna is a 1460–1464 painting by Giovanni Bellini, once part of the Frizzoni collection in Bergamo. It entered the Museo Correr in Venice in 1891, the same year as it was identified as a work by Bellini. It was originally an oil on wood painting, but it was transferred to canvas before entering the Museo Correr.

References

1464 paintings
Paintings of the Madonna and Child by Giovanni Bellini
Collections of the Museo Correr